Old Edwardians Football Club commonly known as  Old Edwards or simply Edwards is a Sierra Leonean football club based in the capital Freetown. The club is a member of the Sierra Leone National Premier League, the top football league in Sierra Leone.

Old Edwardians are one of the biggest and most popular clubs in Sierra Leone. Former Sierra Leonean international footballer Mohamed Kallon started his professional football career at Old Edwardians as a fifteen-year-old.

Honours
Sierra Leone National Premier League champions: 1
 1990
Sierra Leonean FA Cup winners: 3
 1984, 2001, 2005

External links
Page at Sierra Leone Football.com

Football clubs in Sierra Leone